Branded asset management refers to the implementation of brand modifications and life-cycle management of branded assets. The branded assets category includes managing digital brand execution.

Background

Branding emerged as a top management priority around the 2000’s due to the growing realization that a brand is one of the most valuable assets that a firm can have. A brand is more than just a name on a stationery, clothes, plant, or equipment. It carries meaning to all stakeholders and represents a set of values, promises and even a personality of its own. Most companies with the biggest increases in brand value operate as single brands all over the world. 

The goal of many corporations today is to create consistency and impact, both of which are a lot easier to manage with the concept of a global brand  that offers a single worldwide identity. Branding and brand management strategies are efficient approaches as they can be employed globally. However, global marketing and increased competition have added pressure to the brand management structure. Today's marketplace is cluttered with hundreds of brands that strive to seize the attention of consumers.

References

Brand management